William B. Cramer  was an American outfielder in  Major League Baseball. He played in two games for the 1883 New York Gothams.

External links

1885 deaths
Major League Baseball outfielders
New York Gothams players
19th-century baseball players
Baseball players from New York (state)
Year of birth missing